Lipnik or Lipník may refer to:

Bosnia and Herzegovina
Lipnik (Gacko), a village in the Gacko municipality
Lipnik (Ilijaš), a village in the Ilijaš municipality

Bulgaria
Lipnik, a village in Razgrad Municipality

Czech Republic
Lipník (Mladá Boleslav District), a municipality and village in the Central Bohemian Region
Lipník (Třebíč District), a municipality and village in the Vysočina Region
Lipník nad Bečvou, a town in the Olomouc Region

Poland
Lipnik, Bielsko-Biała, a district of Bielsko-Biała
Lipnik, Gmina Grajewo in Podlaskie Voivodeship (north-east Poland)
Lipnik, Gmina Szczuczyn in Podlaskie Voivodeship (north-east Poland)
Lipnik, Łomża County in Podlaskie Voivodeship (north-east Poland)
Lipnik, Łódź Voivodeship (central Poland)
Lipnik, Lesser Poland Voivodeship (south Poland)
Lipnik, Subcarpathian Voivodeship (south-east Poland)
Lipnik, Opatów County in Świętokrzyskie Voivodeship (south-central Poland)
Lipnik, Pińczów County in Świętokrzyskie Voivodeship (south-central Poland)
Lipnik, Staszów County in Świętokrzyskie Voivodeship (south-central Poland)
Lipnik, Silesian Voivodeship (south Poland)
Lipnik, Pomeranian Voivodeship (north Poland)
Lipnik, Warmian-Masurian Voivodeship (north Poland)
Lipnik, West Pomeranian Voivodeship (north-west Poland)

Russia
 Lipnik, Kursk Oblast, a village
 Lipnik, Pskov Oblast, a village
 Lipnik, Cherepovetsky District, Vologda Oblast, a village
 Lipnik, Vashkinsky District, Vologda Oblast, a village

Slovakia
Lipník, Prievidza, a municipality and village in the Trenčín Region
Malý Lipník, a municipality and village in the Prešov Region
Veľký Lipník, a municipality and village in the Prešov Region

Slovenia
Lipnik, Trebnje, a settlement in the Municipality of Trebnje in Slovenia